Javukha (Brahmi:  Ja-vu-kha, Bactrian: Zabocho, or Zabokho) was the third known king of the Alchon Huns, in the 5th century CE. He is described as such in the Talagan copper scroll inscription, where he is also said to be Maharaja ("Great King"), and the "son of Sadavikha". In the scroll he also appears to be rather contemporary with Toramana.

Coin types
Javukha issued coins in the Bactrian script as well as in the Brahmi, suggesting a regnal claim to areas both north and south of the Hindu Kush, from Bactria to Northern Pakistan.

He issued some silver coins in which he is shown riding a horse, copying a Gupta horse type coinage which appears on the coins of Chandragupta II (r. 380-413 CE) or Kumaragupta I (r. 415-455 CE).

References

Central Asia
Hephthalites
430 births
490 deaths